Since the introduction of Crayola drawing crayons by Binney & Smith in 1903, more than two hundred distinctive colors have been produced in a wide variety of assortments. Crayola became such a hit because the company figured out a way to inexpensively combine paraffin wax with safe pigments. The line has undergone several major revisions in its history, notably in 1935, 1949, 1958, and 1990.  Numerous specialty crayons have also been produced, complementing the basic Crayola assortment.

1903: the original Crayola colors

After several decades producing commercial pigments, Binney & Smith produced their first crayon, the black Staonal Marking Crayon, in 1902.  The following year, the company decided to enter the consumer market with its first drawing crayons.  The name Crayola was suggested by Alice Binney, wife of company founder Edwin Binney, combining craie, French for "chalk," a reference to the pastels that preceded and lent their name to the first drawing crayons, with the suffix -ola, meaning "oleaginous," a reference to the wax from which the crayons were made.  Initially this was just one of the brands produced by Binney & Smith; other crayons were produced under names such as Cerola, Cerata, Durel, Perma, and Boston, among others; but the Crayola brand proved the most successful, and was produced in two lines: Crayola Gold Medal School Crayons and "Rubens" Crayola Artists' Crayons.

Early Crayola advertising mentions thirty different colors, although there is no official list; in fact thirty-eight different crayons are known from Crayola boxes of this period.  The largest labeled assortment was box No. 51, titled Crayola Young Artists' Drawing Crayons, which included twenty-eight different crayons.  Other colors were found in different boxes, including the "Rubens" No. 500, a twenty-four crayon assortment.  The names of several crayons varied from box to box; in general the larger assortments tended to use names associated with oil paints, and in fact early Crayola literature frequently describes drawing with crayons as a form of painting.

Over time, simpler names were favored, and several colors were discontinued by 1910, including Light and Dark Venetian Red, Permanent Geranium Lake, Celestial Blue, Raw Sienna, and Charcoal Gray; the use of "Purple" as an alternative for "Violet" ended about 1914; and after 1915 Gold, Silver, and Copper were no longer available in assortments, although Gold and Silver were still available in bulk.

Munsell Crayola, 1926–1944

In 1926, Binney & Smith acquired the Munsell Color Company's line of crayons, based on the Munsell color system developed by Albert Henry Munsell.  This marked the first time that Crayola crayons incorporated the concept of the color wheel.  The Munsell color wheel consisted of five "principal hues" (red, yellow, green, blue, and purple), and five "intermediate hues" (yellow red, green yellow, blue green, blue purple, and red purple).  Each color was available in either "maximum chroma" or with "middle value and middle chroma."  Three different packages were offered: a box of seven containing the five principal hues at maximum chroma plus Middle Gray and Black, a box of twelve containing the five principal hues, both at maximum chroma and at middle value and chroma, plus Middle Gray and Black, and a box of twenty-two, containing both the principal and intermediate hues, each at maximum chroma as well as with middle value and chroma, plus Middle Gray and Black.

The Munsell color wheel prompted Binney & Smith to adopt a similar color wheel concept for Crayola crayons in 1930, using six principal hues (red, orange, yellow, green, blue, and violet) and six intermediate hues (red-orange, yellow-orange, yellow-green, blue-green, blue-violet, and red-violet), for a twelve-color wheel.  These were combined with Black, Neutral Gray, White, and Brown to produce a sixteen-color box.  Munsell Crayola boxes were discontinued in 1935, although the crayons were produced in specially-marked Crayola boxes until 1944, when wartime shortages made many of the pigments necessary for crayon production unavailable.  Munsell crayons were not produced again after the war, but the concept of the color wheel pioneered by Munsell remained a fundamental part of the Crayola lineup until 1990.

The Munsell colors are depicted in the table below.

Changes through 1949

From 1930 to 1935, Binney & Smith refined the Crayola line-up, discontinuing some colors, adjusting others, and incorporating the Munsell colors into its regular line.  In 1939, the company introduced the No. 52 assortment, containing fifty-two colors, including all of the Munsell colors and all but six of the other crayons then being produced.  Although it was by far the largest Crayola assortment yet offered, the No. 52 received little publicity, and was only produced for about five years; in 1944, wartime shortages made the pigments necessary to produce many colors unavailable.

When full production was resumed in 1949, Binney & Smith eliminated most of the Munsell colors and their significant overlap with other hues.  The new lineup was based around the twelve-color Crayola color wheel, first developed in the 1930s.  While new crayons were added to the assortment, the overall number of colors dropped to forty-eight, and the No. 52 box was formally discontinued in favor of the new No. 48 assortment, containing all of the colors then being produced.

While many older crayons were eliminated from the Crayola line, several new colors representing light, medium, and dark shades of the principal and intermediate hues were added, to create the most systematic assortment yet produced.  For ten years, the No. 48 box was Crayola's largest collection, and for decades afterward, it remained an integral part of the line.

Crayola No. 64

Introduced in 1958, the Crayola No. 64 was Binney & Smith's largest regular assortment for more than thirty years, and featured the last major changes to Crayola colors before 1990.  The iconic flip-top box arranged sixty-four crayons in four rows of sixteen, progressively raised to allow for easier access, and a crayon sharpener built into the back of the box.

Although a few of the colors from the No. 48 box were discontinued at this time, most were retained, sometimes with different names, and several new crayons were added to the assortment, including six new "intermediate" hues, as the Crayola color wheel expanded from twelve to eighteen colors.

Changes 1958–1990
The first changes to the No. 64 box were made in its first year of production, as Light Blue and Brilliant Rose were replaced by Turquoise Blue and Magenta.  From then to 1990, no colors were replaced, although, in 1963, Flesh was formally renamed Peach, partially in response to the civil rights movement, the company said. Flesh had been known as Flesh Tint until 1949, and was called Pink Beige from 1956 to 1958. In 1962, the flesh-colored crayon was not featured in the commemorative box because Crayola felt it was insensitive. They recognized that not all skin tones are the same.

The 1970s saw the introduction of Crayola's first specialty crayons, eight fluorescent colors designed to glow under black light.  These were never added to the No. 64 box, but were available separately or in a special box of 72 crayons, typically packaged with activity books or crayon stands.  Fabric crayons were introduced in 1980, as the Crayola brand continued to expand beyond regular drawing crayons.  Colored pencils and markers followed.

1990–present

1990 saw the first major changes to Crayola drawing crayons in more than thirty years, as eight colors were "retired into the Crayon Hall of Fame," and eight new colors were introduced, followed by sixteen more in 1993, and twenty-four more in 1998.  Five colors were replaced between 2000 and 2003.

The first major change was the replacement of eight colors that had long been part of the Crayola lineup.  These were: Orange-Red (first produced in 1958), Maize (formerly Gold Ochre, produced since 1903), Orange-Yellow (1958), Lemon Yellow (formerly Light Yellow, produced since 1903), Green-Blue (1958), Violet-Blue (produced as Blue-Violet from 1930 to 1958), Raw Umber (1903), and Blue-Gray (1958).  With the loss of Orange-Red, Orange-Yellow, Green-Blue, and Violet-Blue, the Crayola color wheel was reduced from eighteen to fourteen colors, with six "principal hues" and eight "intermediate" hues.  The eight new colors were: Vivid Tangerine, Dandelion (later retired in 2017), Jungle Green, Teal Blue (later retired in 2003), Cerulean, Royal Purple, Fuchsia, and Wild Strawberry.

Late in 1992, Binney & Smith introduced the Crayola No. 96 Big Box, containing the sixty-four existing colors, as well as sixteen fluorescent crayons, and sixteen unnamed colors, the names of which were to be chosen in a nationwide contest.  The winners were announced the following year, and included: Macaroni and Cheese, Asparagus, Granny Smith Apple, Shamrock, Tropical Rain Forest, Robin's Egg Blue, Pacific Blue, Denim, Purple Mountains' Majesty, Wisteria, Cerise, Razzmatazz, Tickle Me Pink, Mauvelous, Tumbleweed, and Timberwolf.

In 1996, a special color called Blue Ribbon was produced to celebrate the production of one hundred billion Crayola crayons since 1903.  Crayons of this color were included in "limited edition" versions of the No. 96 box produced early that year, but it did not become part of the regular assortment.  The following year, four bright colors were introduced: Sunset Orange, Caribbean Green, Vivid Violet, and Pink Flamingo, which were then incorporated into the regular lineup.  1997 also saw a contest called to name eight new colors, incorporated into assortments the following year: Torch Red (later “Scarlet” in 1998), Banana Mania, Mountain Meadow, Outer Space, Purple Heart, Brink Pink (later “Pink Sherbet” in 2005), Fuzzy Wuzzy Brown, and Shadow.

1998 saw the introduction of Crayola's first 120-count assortment.  In addition to the existing colors, twelve more were added to the lineup in order to bring the count of regular and fluorescent crayons up to 120.  These were: Canary, Fern, Manatee, Blue Bell, Eggplant, Cotton Candy, Cranberry (later “Blush” in 2005), Pig Pink, Beaver, Desert Sand, Almond, and Antique Brass, a metallic crayon.  The same year, Torch Red became Scarlet.

In 1999, Indian Red, part of the Crayola lineup since 1903, was renamed Chestnut, ostensibly because of confusion that children would assume that the color referred to the skin color of American Indians, rather than a reddish pigment from India.  Thistle, originally produced as Light Magenta in 1949, was replaced by Indigo.

To celebrate the hundredth anniversary of Crayola Crayons in 2003, a special 100-count box was created, adding four new colors to the existing 96-color box.  As in 1992 and 1996, the names were chosen as part of a contest, and the four new crayons became part of the No. 96 box at the end of the anniversary year.  The new colors were: Mango Tango, Inchworm, Wild Blue Yonder, and Jazzberry Jam.  To make room for them, four other crayons were retired; two of the sixteen fluorescent colors (Magic Mint and Blizzard Blue), plus Mulberry (produced since 1958) and  Teal Blue (introduced in 1990). Crayola enthusiasts were given the opportunity to save one of five colors nominated for retirement via an internet poll: the winner was Burnt Sienna.

Three colors received new names in 2005, as Brink Pink became Pink , Cranberry became Blush, and Fuzzy Wuzzy Brown was shortened to Fuzzy Wuzzy.  Since these changes, the Crayola lineup has remained steady, with changes confined to specialty crayons.

On March 31, 2017, Crayola announced it would retire Dandelion, to replace it with a blue color. A public vote was held, and in September 14, 2017, the new crayon color's name was announced as "Bluetiful". The crayon color was included in the boxes for sale starting in late January 2018.

In 2021, four new colors were introduced: "Crayellow", "Powder Blue", "Cool Mint", and "Oatmeal".

The following table includes all of the standard colors introduced since 1990.

The Crayola color wheel

1926: 10 colors
The concept of the color wheel first became associated with Crayola crayons with Binney & Smith's acquisition of the Munsell line in 1926.  Munsell's color system was based on five "principal hues" and five "intermediate hues," resulting in a color wheel of ten colors.  The principal hues were red, yellow, green, blue, and purple; the intermediate hues were yellow red, green yellow, blue green, blue purple, and red purple.  Each was available with either maximum chroma or with middle value and middle chroma.  The following table depicts all of the principal and intermediate hues at maximum chroma.

1930: 12 colors
In 1930, Binney & Smith adopted the concept of the color wheel into its own line, including orange as a principal hue, and basing the other hues on its existing colors rather than the Munsell version.  This resulted in a twelve-color wheel that fit neatly into the regular Crayola lineup.

Adjustments in 1935 and 1949
The only significant changes to the Crayola color wheel between 1930 and 1958 occurred in 1935, when the original blue was replaced with a darker hue, and 1949, when a new version of violet was introduced:

1958: 18 colors
In 1958, Binney & Smith introduced the No. 64 box, with numerous changes to the existing palette, and a major revision of the color wheel, which expanded from twelve to eighteen colors.  The six intermediate hues were doubled, so that there were now two intermediate hues between each of the principal hues.  The 1935 blue was replaced with a more intense color, and a new, darker blue-green was substituted for the previous version; the 1930 version of violet returned, while the 1949 violet became blue-violet, and the original blue-violet became violet-blue.  The 1958 color wheel remained a fixture of Crayola crayons until 1990, when four of the colors were discontinued: orange-red, orange-yellow, green-blue, and violet-blue.  Without these colors, the Crayola color wheel includes fourteen colors; there are two hues between yellow and green, and two between violet and red, but only one between the other principal hues.

See also 
 List of Crayola crayon colors
 Timeline of Crayola
 List of colors

Footnotes

References 

Crayola
Crayola crayons, History
Cray

es:Crayola#Historia